The 14th annual 2010 Webby Awards were held in New York City on June 14, 2010. They were hosted by comedian B. J. Novak, and the lifetime achievement award was given to Vinton Cerf. The awards were judged by the International Academy of Digital Arts and Sciences.

The set design for the show was provided by Tribal DDB Worldwide in an attempt to change the show's image by emphasizing the competitive nature of the awards, calling the ceremony "The Battle for Web Supremacy." EastMedia also altered the website to reflect The People's Voice campaign. As a result, the number of popular votes this year exceeded 900,000 and there were over 1 million site views (10% from social media). As in previous years, the awards ceremony was made available for viewers via the official Webby YouTube channel.

Nominees and winners

(from http://www.webbyawards.com/winners/2010)

External links
webbyawards.com - official awards website
flash gallery of award winners

Notes
Winners and nominees are generally named according to the organization or website winning the award, although the recipient is, technically, the web design firm or internal department that created the winning site and in the case of corporate websites, the designer's client.  Web links are provided for informational purposes, both in the most recently available archive.org version before the awards ceremony and, where available, the current website.  Many older websites no longer exist, are redirected, or have been substantially redesigned.

2010
2010 awards in the United States
2010 in New York City
June 2010 events in the United States
2010 in Internet culture